Timothy Vincent Johnson (July 23, 1946 – May 9, 2022) was an American politician and lawyer from Illinois. He was a member of the Republican Party and did not run for re-election in 2012.

Early life, education, and early political career
Johnson was born in Champaign to Robert and Margaret Evans Johnson, and spent his childhood in Urbana, where he graduated from Urbana High School.

He attended the United States Military Academy at West Point in 1964, followed by the University of Illinois at Urbana-Champaign. Johnson majored in history and graduated in 1969 Phi Beta Kappa, receiving the Bronze tablet, an honor given to the top 3% of undergraduates. In 1972, Johnson graduated with honors from the University of Illinois College of Law and was elected to the Order of the Coif, a national legal honor society.

In 1971, Johnson was elected to the city council of Urbana, Illinois.

Illinois House of Representatives

In 1976, Johnson was elected to serve as a representative in Springfield, after besting five other Republican candidates in the 1976 Republican primary. Johnson remained a member of the Illinois House of Representatives from 1976 to 2000.

While running for re-election in 1980, a photograph was published showing Johnson had rigged a paper clip on the voting panel at his desk in the legislative chamber, pressing down the "yes" button so an affirmative vote could be recorded, even if he was not in the chamber. He initially denied installing it, but later said it was "accepted practice" in the legislature. Twenty years later, when Johnson ran for U.S. Congress, Mike Kelleher, his Democratic rival, had the story documented on a website dedicated to the photograph and Johnson's reactions, saying "It would be funny, if it weren't so serious..."

For most of his career, Johnson represented much of the more rural and conservative portion of Champaign County, along with portions of Ford and Douglas counties. After the 1990 census, Johnson was drawn into the same district as Democrat Helen F. Satterthwaite, who had long represented the other side of Urbana, as well as the University of Illinois at Urbana-Champaign. However, the new district was more Johnson's territory than Satterthwaite's; Republicans outnumbered Democrats by almost 3 to 1. It also didn't include Satterthwaite's old base at the U of I. At that election, Johnson won with 60 percent of the vote.

U.S. House of Representatives

Elections

2004
In 2004, Johnson raised $533,478 in campaign funds, less than half the national average for a Republican running for reelection ($1,206,138). The 2004 campaign fundraising was about a quarter of the $1,943,630 raised by his initial campaign in 2000; that in turn was nearly double the amount raised by his fellow freshmen Republicans ($1,171,118). Johnson defeated Democratic candidate David Gill 61% to 39% .

2006
In his 2000 campaign, Johnson pledged not to serve more than three terms. However, he ran for re-election in 2008 and 2010. Johnson "underestimated the value of seniority," spokesman Phil Bloomer says of his boss' decision to run for a fifth term. "As a rookie going in, (he) didn't understand what he could accomplish for his district by being there a longer period."

In the 2006 election in November, Johnson again faced Democrat David Gill.

At the end of June 2006, Johnson had over $130,000 available for spending for his 2006 campaign, more than double the total amount raised by his opponent at that point. In the 2006 midterm elections, he was reelected by a slightly narrower 58-42% margin.

2008

Johnson received 64.19% of his district's votes, defeating Democratic nominee Steve Cox.

2010

Johnson defeated Democratic nominee David Gill.

2012
The redrawn district stretched from Champaign-Urbana through Springfield and Bloomington to the outer suburbs of St. Louis. Johnson now found himself in a district that was mostly new to him; he only retained about 30 percent of his former territory.

On March 14, 2012, Johnson endorsed Texas Congressman Ron Paul in the 2012 Republican Presidential primary in Illinois.

On April 5, 2012, just days after winning the Republican nomination for the reconfigured 13th, Johnson announced his retirement from office, to the surprise of many.

Tenure
Outside of meetings, committee hearings, and votes, Johnson was said to spend "nearly every waking minute" cold-calling his constituents; the practice amounted to calls to "more than a half-million constituents" during his first six terms in office.

In the House, Johnson's voting record was the most moderate among Illinois Republicans outside of the Chicago metropolitan area. In 2010, American Conservative Union gave him its second-lowest rating among Illinois Republicans, behind only Mark Steven Kirk of the 10th District. However, he was a member of the conservative Republican Study Committee.

For each of the 107th, 108th, 109th, and 110th Congresses Johnson received a score of 0% from the Human Rights Campaign. This was for, among other things, voting against the Employment Non-Discrimination Act, which would have prohibited discrimination in the workplace based on sexual orientation, and for refusing to adopt a written policy for his own office pledging not to discriminate on the basis of sexual orientation in employment decisions.
Meanwhile, the Family Research Council, a conservative watchdog, in its most recent scorecard gives Johnson a 100%.

Johnson voted against the Stem Cell Research Enhancement Act, which passed but was vetoed by President George W. Bush.
In June 2006, Johnson voted against net neutrality, by voting for the COPE Act, and against the Markey amendment that would have inserted provisions to preserve network neutrality.
Johnson was the sole Republican congressman to vote against the FISA Amendments Act of 2008 including immunity for American telecommunications companies that implemented warrantless wiretaps outside of the scope of the FISA program for the Bush administration. The bill passed, 293-129.
On November 7, 2009, Johnson was the only Republican voting against the Republican Health Care Reform plan, the Boehner amendment to the Affordable Health Care for America Act.
On February 8, 2011, Johnson was one of 26 Republicans who voted against extending the PATRIOT Act.

Committee assignments
Committee on Agriculture
Subcommittee on Department Operations, Oversight, and Credit
Subcommittee on Rural Development, Research, Biotechnology, and Foreign Agriculture (Chairman)
Committee on Transportation and Infrastructure
Subcommittee on Economic Development, Public Buildings and Emergency Management
Subcommittee on Highways and Transit
Subcommittee on Water Resources and Environment

Caucus memberships
Congressional Central Aisle Caucus (Co-founder)
Congressional Fire Services Caucus
Congressional Internet Caucus
Congressional Rural Caucus
International Conservation Caucus
Congressional Caucus on Foster Youth

Post congressional career
In 2015, Johnson was elected to the Parkland College Board of Trustees.

In 2015, Johnson petitioned to become a delegate for Senator Marco Rubio's Presidential campaign.

Personal life
Johnson had nine children. He died at his home in Urbana, Illinois, on May 9, 2022, aged 75.

Awards and honors
Johnson was inducted as a Laureate of The Lincoln Academy of Illinois and awarded the Order of Lincoln (the State’s highest honor) by the then Governor of Illinois, Pat Quinn in 2013 in the area of Communications.

References

External links

 

  

|-
  

|-

1946 births
2022 deaths
20th-century American lawyers
20th-century American politicians
21st-century American lawyers
21st-century American politicians
American Pentecostals
Assemblies of God people
Illinois city council members
Illinois lawyers
Republican Party members of the Illinois House of Representatives
People from Champaign, Illinois
People from Urbana, Illinois
Republican Party members of the United States House of Representatives from Illinois
University of Illinois College of Law alumni
United States Military Academy alumni